Eusparassus levantinus is a spider species found in Spain.

See also
List of Sparassidae species

References

External links

Sparassidae
Fauna of Spain
Spiders of Europe
Spiders described in 2005